Daniel Morrissey (born 20 April 1993) is an Irish hurler who plays as a left wing-back for club side Ahane and at inter-county level with the Limerick senior hurling team.

Early life

Morrissey was born in Castleconnell, County Limerick. His brother, Tom Morrissey, also plays for Ahane and the Limerick senior hurling team.

Playing career

University

During his studies at the University of Limerick, Morrissey was selected for the college's senior hurling team. On 11 March 2015, he won a Fitzgibbon Cup medal as UL defeated the Waterford Institute of Technology by 2-18 to 1-14 in a replay of the final at Páirc Uí Rinn.

Club

Morrissey joined the Ahane club at a young age and played in all grades at juvenile and underage levels before joining the club's senior team.

Inter-county

Minor and under-21

Morrissey first played for Limerick at minor level. He made his first appearance on 25 June 2010 in a 1-17 to 2-12 defeat by Clare in the Munster Championship. Morrissey was eligible for the minor grade again in 2011, however, his season ended with a 4-17 to 3-15 defeat by Waterford.

Morrissey subsequently joined the Limerick under-21 hurling team. He made his first appearance on 18 July 2012 in a 1-16 to 1-11 defeat by Tipperary. Morrissey's three successive seasons with the team ended without success.

Senior

Morrissey made his senior debut for Limerick on 23 February 2014, replacing Gavin O'Mahony for the final 12 minutes of a National Hurling League game against Antrim at the Gaelic Grounds. He was an unused substitute for the subsequent championship campaign.

On 12 March 2017, Morrissey scored his first point for Limerick in a 6-33 to 1-19 defeat of Laois in the National League.

Morrissey was named man of the match, beating Kilkenny's Eoin Murphy and his brother Tom, following Limerick's All-Ireland quarter-final defeat of Kilkenny on 15 July 2018.

On 19 August 2018, Morrissey was at left wing-back when Limerick won their first All-Ireland title in 45 years after a 3-16 to 2-18 defeat of Galway in the final. He ended the season by winning an All-Star Award.

On 31 March 2019, Morrissey was selected at left wing-back for Limerick's National League final meeting with Waterford at Croke Park. He collected a winners' medal following the 1-24 to 0-19 victory. On 30 June 2019, Morrissey won a Munster Championship medal at left wing-back following Limerick's 2-26 to 2-14 defeat of Tipperary in the final.

On 25 October 2020, Morrissey won a second successive National League medal after Limerick's 0-36 to 1-23 win over Clare in the delayed final. Later that season he claimed a second successive Munster Championship medal after lining out at full-back in the 0-25 to 0-21 Munster final defeat of Waterford.

Career statistics

Honours

University of Limerick
Fitzgibbon Cup (1): 2015

Limerick
All-Ireland Senior Hurling Championship (2): 2018, 2020
Munster Senior Hurling Championship (3): 2019, 2020, 2021
National Hurling League (2): 2019, 2020

Individual
All-Star Award (2): 2018, 2020
The Sunday Game Team of the Year (1): 2020

References

1993 births
Living people
Ahane hurlers
Limerick inter-county hurlers
All Stars Awards winners (hurling)